Phyllonorycter klimeschiella is a moth of the family Gracillariidae. It is known from the Canary Islands.

The larvae feed on Arbutus canariensis. They mine the leaves of their host plant. The mine starts as a lower-surface epidermal corridor along the midrib. Later, it becomes a tentiform mine with one Y-shaped fold. The frass is mostly scattered throughout the mine, or sometimes deposited in a clump. The roof of the mine is completely eaten out. Pupation takes place within the mine in a cocoon covered with frass.

References

klimeschiella
Insects of the Canary Islands
Moths of Africa
Moths described in 1970